Mikhaylovsk is the name of several inhabited localities in Russia.

Urban localities
Mikhaylovsk, Stavropol Krai, a town in Shpakovsky District of Stavropol Krai
Mikhaylovsk, Sverdlovsk Oblast, a town in Nizhneserginsky District of Sverdlovsk Oblast

Rural localities
Mikhaylovsk, Pochepsky District, Bryansk Oblast, a settlement in Baklansky Rural Administrative Okrug of Pochepsky District of Bryansk Oblast
Mikhaylovsk, Starodubsky District, Bryansk Oblast, a selo in Gartsevsky Rural Administrative Okrug of Starodubsky District of Bryansk Oblast
Mikhaylovsk, Udmurt Republic, a village in Ildibayevsky Selsoviet of Kiyasovsky District of the Udmurt Republic

See also
 Michael (disambiguation)
 Mikhaylov (disambiguation)
 Mikhaylovsky (disambiguation)
 Mikhaylovka (disambiguation)